The women's eight competition at the 2000 Summer Olympics in Sydney, Australia took place at the Sydney International Regatta Centre.

Competition format
This rowing event consisted of seven teams, split into two heats. Each team fielded a boat crewed by eight rowers and a coxswain. Each rower used a single oar, with four oars on each side of the boat. The winner of each heat qualified for the final (or medal) round.  The remaining six teams competed in the repechage round, with the top four from that round qualifying for the "Final A" round. The last team in the repechage is eliminated from the competition.

The final ranking for this event was based on the order of finish. The top three teams earned Olympic medals for placing first, second, and third, while the remaining "Final A" teams placed fourth through sixth, according to their final finish.

Schedule
All times are Australian Time (UTC+10)

Results

Heats
The winner of each heat advanced to the finals, remainder goes to the repechage.

Heat 1

Heat 2

Repechage
First four qualify to Finals A.

Finals

References

External links
Official Report of the 2000 Sydney Summer Olympics
Rowing Results

Rowing at the 2000 Summer Olympics
Women's rowing at the 2000 Summer Olympics
Women's events at the 2000 Summer Olympics